William Islwyn "Izzy" Davies (20 March 1912 – 1997) was a Welsh professional rugby league footballer who played in the 1930s.

Background
Izzy Davies was born in Merthyr Tydfil, Wales, and he died in Warrington, Cheshire, England.

Playing career

International honours
Izzy Davies played , i.e. number 2 and scored a goal for Wales while at St. Helens in the 11-24 defeat by England at Anfield, Liverpool on Wednesday 10 April 1935.

Club record
Izzy Davies held Warrington's "Most Tries In A Season" record with 34 tries scored during the 1938–39 Northern Rugby Football League season, the 34th try coming against Oldham on Saturday 29 April 1939, this record was extended by Brian Bevan.

References

External links
Statistics at wolvesplayers.thisiswarrington.co.uk

1912 births
1997 deaths
Rugby league centres
Rugby league players from Merthyr Tydfil
Rugby league wingers
St Helens R.F.C. players
Wales national rugby league team players
Warrington Wolves players
Welsh rugby league players